is a white flour from the Indian subcontinent, made from wheat. Finely milled without any bran, refined, and bleached, it closely resembles cake flour.  is used extensively for making fast foods, baked goods such as pastries, bread, several varieties of sweets, and traditional flatbreads. Owing to this wide variety of uses, it is sometimes labeled and marketed as "all-purpose flour", though it is different from American all-purpose flour.

Production

 is made from the endosperm: the starchy white part of the grain. The bran is separated from the germ and endosperm which is then refined by passing through a sieve of 80 mesh per inch (31 mesh per centimeter). Although naturally yellowish due to pigments present in wheat,  is typically bleached, either naturally due to atmospheric oxygen, or with any of a number of  flour bleaching agents.

While it is milled from winter wheat that has a high gluten content, heat generated during the milling process results in denaturing of the protein, limiting its use in the preparation of leavened breads.

Controversy
A common misconception is that  contains alloxan, which itself is banned in a lot of countries for usage in food, added as a bleaching agent or formed as a byproduct of bleaching. While it is a minor product of xanthophyll oxidation, there is no evidence that trace amounts of alloxan formed comprise a health risk.

Applications
 is used extensively in Central Asian cuisine, cuisine from the Indian subcontinent and Caribbean cuisine. Flatbreads such as naan and tandoori roti are made using .

See also
Atta
Graham bread
Semolina
Jalebi

References

Flour
South Asian cuisine
Indo-Caribbean cuisine